The Swiss Code of Obligations (SR/RS 22, ; ;) is a portion of the second part (SR/RS 2) of the internal Swiss law ("Private law - Administration of civil justice - Enforcement") that regulates contract law and corporations (Aktiengesellschaft). It was first adopted in 1911 (effective since 1 January 1912).

Swiss law is often used to regulate international contracts, as it is deemed neutral with respect to the parties. It is no. 220 in the Swiss Official Compilation of Federal Legislation.

History
In Switzerland, private law was originally left to the individual Swiss cantons, which enacted codifications such as the Zurich Law of Obligations of 1855.

In 1864, the Bernese jurist Walther Munzinger was assigned a task to draft a unified code of obligations. This early project came to nothing, as it was not yet considered to fall under federal jurisdiction. Four years later, the Federal Council agreed to the unification of the law of obligations, and Munzinger was put in charge of thee effort. After Munzinger's death in 1873, the project fell to Heinrich Fick.

The earliest version of the Code of Obligations was adopted in 1881, and came into force on 1 January 1883. Munzinger, the main drafter of the 1881 Code, was influenced by the Dresdner Draft and the work of Johann Caspar Bluntschli.

The current Code of Obligations was adopted on 30 March 1911, becoming the fifth book of the Swiss Civil Code. Changes enacted in 1911 are relatively minor, mostly reflecting the influence of the German Civil Code. The Code of Obligations was drafted in a strikingly understandable style, without many instances of abstract legal terminology, so that it could be readily understood by the common population.

Company law was subsequently revised in 1938, and the law regulating contracts of employment in 1972. The Code was revised in 2011, so that in the future requirements for book-keeping and accounting will not depend on a company's legal form, but on its financial size.

Contents
The Code of Obligations includes five divisions. The Code of Obligations is part of the Civil Code, but its provisions are numbered individually.

General Provisions (arts. 1-183)
Includes general contract law, tort law, unjust enrichment.

 Principle of freedom of contract;
 Conclusion of a contract;
 Interpretation of a contract;
 Nullity of a contract: impossibility, unlawfulness, immorality, non-respect of the required form;
 Defeasibility of a contract: unfair advantage, error, fraud, duress;
 Non-commercial agency;
 Breach of contract;
 Quasi-contractual obligations;
 Obligations in tort;
 Restitution of an unjust enrichment;
 Time limits.

Types of Contractual Relationship (184-551)
Includes specific contracts, including the purchase contract (184-236), employment contract (363-379), mandate contract (394-406).

 sale and exchange (184-238);
 sale of movable property (187-215);
 sale of immovable property (216-221);
 gifts (239-252);
 rental (253-304);
 loan (305-318);
 loan for use (commodatum) (305-311);
 loan for consummation (mutuum) (312-318);
 employment contracts (319-362);
 hire of services (363-379);
 publishing contract (380-393);
 mandate (394-418);
 negotiorum gestio (419-424);
 commission contract (425-439);
 contract of carriage (440-457);
 power of attorney / commercial agency (458-465);
 delegation (466-471);
 deposit (472-491);
 suretyship (492-512);
 gambling and betting (513-515);
 life annuity contract and lifetime maintenance agreement (516-529);
 simple partnership (530-551).

Commercial Enterprises and the Cooperative (552-926)
Corporate law.

Types of business associations:
 sole proprietorship;
 partnerships:
 general partnership (552-593);
 limited partnership (594-619);
 companies:
 public limited company (plc. or German: AG, French/Italian: SA; 620-763);
 partnership limited by shares (764-771);
 private limited company (Ltd. or German: GmbH, French: S.á.r.l, Italian: S.a.g.l.; 772-827);
 cooperative (828-926).

The Commercial Register, Business Names and Commercial Accounting (927-964)
 Business names (944-956);
 Commercial accounting and Financial Reporting (957-963).

Negotiable Securities (965-1186)
Commercial papers.

 registered securities (974-977);
 bearer securities (978-989);
 bills and notes (990-1099);
 cheque (1100-1144);
 bill-like securities and other instruments to order (1145-1152);
 document of title of goods (1153-1155);
 bonds (1156-1186);

Principles and influences
The contract law of the Code of Obligations is based on Roman Law traditions, and it was particularly influenced by the Pandectist school. It was also heavily influenced by the Code Napoleon of 1804.

Swiss contract law discriminates between general and special contract rules. The general rules are based on legal theory developed in the 17th and 18th centuries, while special rules are based on Roman law traditions. It is divided into a general part, which applies to all contracts, and a special part, which applies to specific types of contracts, such as sales of goods or loans.

The Code is governed by the principle of the freedom to contract, which includes freedom as to the content and type of the contract, and the freedom of the parties to enter into agreements which are not governed by the special part of the Code.

One major difference compared to contract law in Common Law jurisdictions is the lack of a requirement of consideration. The concept of frustration of purpose is also not part of the Swiss legal tradition.

The first version of the Swiss Code of Obligations influenced parts of the German Civil Code, the Chinese Code of Taiwan (Book II), the Code of South Korea (Part III) and the Code of Thailand (Book II). The Turkish Civil Code, adopted in 1926, is based on the Swiss Civil Code, which also includes the Code of Obligations.

See also 
 Swiss law
 Swiss Civil Code
 Swiss Criminal Code
 Swiss Alliance of Consumer Organisations

References

External links
 SR220Federal Act on the Amendment of the Swiss Civil Code (Part Five: The Code of Obligations) - English semi-official translation

Law of Switzerland
Civil codes
Law of obligations